is a turn-based strategy video game produced by Konami in 1989 which is based upon the characters and conflicts of the popular Gradius series. It was released only in Japan. The game received a sequel in 1997, with Paro Wars, which is the Parodius equivalent of this game.

The object of Cosmic Wars is to use an army composed of Gradius characters (Vic Vipers, and Big Cores) and battle enemies in various star systems. The player can be either the Bacterion Empire or the forces of Gradius. There are many different unit types, ranging from small fighters to large capital ships.

External links
Cosmic Wars at Giant Bomb

1989 video games
Gradius video games
Nintendo Entertainment System games
Nintendo Entertainment System-only games
Japan-exclusive video games
Video games developed in Japan